The List of Atlantic hurricanes in the 18th century encompasses all known Atlantic tropical cyclones from 1700 to 1799. Although not all of the data for every storm that occurred are available, some parts of the coastline were populated enough to provide data of hurricane occurrences.

1700–1724

1725–1749

1750–1770

1770s

1780s

The 1780 Atlantic hurricane season was extraordinarily destructive and was the deadliest Atlantic hurricane season in recorded history with over 25,000 deaths. Four different hurricanes, three in October and one in June, caused at least 1,000 deaths each; this event has never been repeated and only in the 1893 and 2005 seasons were there two such hurricanes. The season also held the deadliest Atlantic tropical cyclone of all time.

Additionally, 1780 was a turning point in Caribbean habitation and trade, marking the end of a long period of economic boom that started in the early 1500s and marked the beginning of an economic decline for the region as news of the devastating hurricanes spread. Eight different storms battered the West Indies including three killer storms in the month of October alone. Tens of thousands were killed across the Caribbean onshore from storm surge, powerful winds and many thousands more killed offshore on sunken ships. The hurricanes struck the Caribbean in the midst of the American Revolutionary War as British and French navies were vying for control over the region and the hurricanes did considerable damage to both fleets wrecking numerous ships and drowning many.

1790s

See also

 List of tropical cyclones
 Atlantic hurricane season

References

External links
 http://www.nhc.noaa.gov/pastdeadly.shtml

18th century
18th-century natural disasters